Aloke Dasgupta is an Indian sitar player in the North Indian classical tradition. He lives in the United States in Torrance, California.

Dasgupta studied under the sarod player Ali Akbar Khan, and has performed with George Harrison, V.G. Jog, the Los Angeles Philharmonic and The Rolling Stones, among others.

References

Year of birth missing (living people)
Sitar players
People from Torrance, California
Living people